Kuwait Connection is a 1973 Egyptian action film directed by Lebanese director Samir A. Khouri and featuring a predominantly Egyptian main cast with Lebanese and Kuwaiti actors. The film was released on DVD by Sabbah Media Corporation in 2002.

Plot
Hired assassin Anwar (Ezzat El Alaili) runs from the police and, wounded, takes refuge in rich libertine Walid's (Mohsen Sarhan) mansion outside Kuwait City. As Anwar narrates his story to Walid's wife Soraya (Nahed Sherif), it is revealed that he was an idealist reporter who became disillusioned with humanity after atrocities he witnessed (starting with Deir Yassin) and was drawn to the criminal world.

Cast
Ezzat El Alaili: Anwar
Mohsen Sarhan: Walid
Nahed Sherif: Soraya
Liz Sarkisian: Nihad, Walid's daughter
Silvana Badrkhan: Linda, Anwar's partner
Mohammed Al-Mansor: Nihad's lover

References

External links
 
 Dhiʼāb lā taʼakulu al-laḥm at ElCinema

1973 films
1970s action adventure films
1970s Arabic-language films
Films set in Kuwait
Egyptian action adventure films